Companies Registration Office can be:
Companies Registration Office (Ireland)
Swedish Companies Registration Office
Companies House - England and Wales
Companies and Intellectual Property Commission (CIPC), South Africa
Trade Register (disambiguation) in the Netherlands, Switzerland, Germany, and Finland